Central Electronics Limited is a Government of India Enterprise under the Department of Scientific and Industrial Research (DSIR), Ministry of Science & Technology. It was established in 1974, with an objective to commercially exploit indigenous technologies developed by National Laboratories and R&D Institutions in the country.

CEL has developed a number of products for the first time in the country through its own R&D efforts and in close association with the premier National & International Laboratories including Defense Laboratories. In recognition of all these efforts, CEL has been awarded a number of times with prestigious awards including “National Award for R&D by DSIR”.

CEL is pioneer in the country in the field of Solar Photovoltaic (SPV) and it has developed the technology with its own R&D efforts. Its solar products have been qualified to International Standards IEC 61215/61730.

CEL has also developed axle counter systems that are being used in Railway signaling system for safe running of trains. Railway products include Single Section Digital Axle Counters (SSDAC), High Availability SSDAC (HA-SSDAC), Multi-section Digital Axle Counter (MSDAC) & Block Proving by Axle Counter (BPAC) using Universal Fail Safe Block Interface (UFSBI). These products have been designed and developed in accordance with CENELEC standards. 

CEL has developed a number of critical components for strategic applications and is supplying these items to Defence.

References

External links
 Official website

Electronics companies of India
Government-owned companies of India
Technology companies established in 1974